Westlake High School (WHS) is a public high school located in Saratoga Springs, Utah, United States. It is part of Utah County's Alpine School District. The school first opened in 2009. In late 2011, construction began for a new junior high school, Frontier Middle School, in nearby Eagle Mountain, which removed 9th grade from Westlake for the 2013–14 school year onwards.

Athletics 

Varsity sports for the Thunder include boys' baseball, boys' and girls' basketball, boys' and girls' cross country, boys' football, boys' and girls' golf, boys' and girls' soccer, girls softball, boys' and girls' swim, boys and girls' tennis, boys' and girls' track & field, girls' volleyball, and boys' and girls' wrestling.

Fine arts
In 2012, Westlake High School's marching band was the 4A State Champion with the show "Making of a Masterpiece," and were a Bands of America regional finalist at the St. George BOA regional, taking 10th place. The "Marching Thunder" repeated as Utah 4A State champion in 2013 with their show, "Our Town," and also placed 4th at the St George, Utah Bands of America Regional. During the 2013 season, the color guard won the "best guard" caption award in every competition entered by the Marching Thunder. With their show "Black Tears", they were a Bands of America regional finalist at the St. George and American Canyon, CA BOA regional, taking 7th place in St. George and 9th in American Canyon. They also placed third in the St. George preliminaries.

The Marching Thunder were invited to be the Utah representative to march in the Pearl Harbor Memorial parade in December 2014 and to march in the 2018 Rose Parade in Pasadena, California.

Clubs and organizations
WHS offers the following extra-curricular activities: 

 Color Guard
 Thundervision
 Boom Squad
 Best Buddies Club
 Table Tennis
 Fundamental Skills for LaCrosse
 French Club
 Key Club
 Broadcasting
 Tabletop Games Club
 Harry Potter Club
 Gaming and Networking
 Math Club
 Westlake Literary Club
 Model United Nations
 Role-ing Thunder (Drama)
 Photography Club
 Hip-Hop Club
 Marching band
 Cheer
 DECA/FBLA
 FCCLA
 American Football
 HOSA
 National Honor Society (NHS)
 Skills USA
 TSA
 Multicultural (LIA)
 Ballroom
 Choir
 Dance Team
 Debate
 Drama Club
 FFA
 Musical Theater
 Orchestra
 Student Government
 Yearbook
Tech Crew for Theatre
 Chinese Club

See also

 List of high schools in Utah

References

External links

 
 Alpine School District
 School Library site
 Westlake Bands site

Public high schools in Utah
Schools in Utah County, Utah
2009 establishments in Utah
Educational institutions established in 2009